is a Japanese computer scientist. He is a professor at the Massachusetts Institute of Technology. Ishii pioneered the Tangible User Interface in the field of Human-computer interaction with the paper "Tangible Bits: Towards Seamless Interfaces between People, Bits and Atoms", co-authored with his then PhD student Brygg Ullmer.

Biography

Ishii was born in Tokyo and raised in Sapporo.
He received B.E. in electronic engineering, and M.E. and Ph.D. in computer engineering from Hokkaido University in Sapporo, Japan.

Hiroshi Ishii founded the Tangible Media Group and started their ongoing
Tangible Bits project in 1995, when he joined the MIT Media Laboratory as
a professor of Media Arts and Sciences. Ishii relocated from Japan's NTT
Human Interface Laboratories in Yokosuka, where he had made his mark in
Human Computer Interaction (HCI) and Computer-Supported Cooperative Work
(CSCW) in the early 1990s. Ishii
was elected to the CHI Academy in 2006. He was named to the 2022 class of ACM Fellows, "for contributions to tangible user interfaces and to human-computer interaction".

He currently teaches the class MAS.834 Tangible Interfaces at the Media Lab.

External links

Computer programmers
Japanese computer scientists
Human–computer interaction researchers
Ubiquitous computing researchers
MIT School of Architecture and Planning faculty
Hokkaido University alumni
MIT Media Lab people
1956 births
Living people
People from Tokyo
Fellows of the Association for Computing Machinery